Natsuki Tanihara (たにはら なつき, August 18, Year Unknown) is a manga artist, but is better known as character designer of visual novels. She is the artist for the media franchise Tantei Opera Milky Holmes, and is often considered the artistic successor to Naru Nanao for the Da Capo franchise.

Works

Visual Novels
D.C. ~Da Capo~ Series
Home Maid
Eternal Fantasy
Renge
Canvas3
Prism Rhythm
Prism ☆ Magical ~Prism Generations!~
Sora Tobu Hitsuji to Manatsu no Hana 
Hana Hime * Absolute!
Starlight Idol -COLORFUL TOP STAGE-

Light Novels and Manga 
Chouki Tensei: Bishounen ni Natte Koukyuu Sennyuu!?
Imouto Jakigan!
Utau Shoujo no Full Score
Yandere Kanojo ga Ippai Sugiru! Seitokaichou, Osananajimi, Gimai, Gibo
Momone Shion no Ranobe Nikki
Oneechan Sensei ga Ryouri Shite Ageru
D.C.S.G.: Da Capo - Second Graduation

References

Living people
Manga artists
Year of birth missing (living people)